The Feihong FH-97 is a prototype unmanned combat aerial vehicle with stealth capabilities. It was developed as a "loyal wingman" drone, designed to suppress air defenses with electronic countermeasures, fly ahead of aircraft to provide early warning, and absorb damage from attacks, as well as providing reconnaissance and damage evaluation. The FH-97 can also deploy the FH-901 to strike maneuvering targets. It was developed by the Aerospace Times Feihong Technology Corporation under the Ninth Academy of the China Aerospace Science and Technology Corporation, a Chinese state-owned defense and aerospace manufacturer. The FH-97 was first unveiled to the public in 2021 at the China International Aviation & Aerospace Exhibition (Airshow China) in Zhuhai, China.

Specifications 
The exact specifications for the Feihong FH-97 are unknown. However, it is widely suspected that Feihong copied the American XQ-58 Valkyrie as they look almost identical.

References 

Chinese military aircraft
Unmanned aerial vehicles of China